José Antonio Anzoátegui (1789–1819) was a Venezuelan brigadier general in the Battle of Boyacá, helping to lead a republican army of Colombians and Venezuelans against Spanish royalist forces during the Venezuelan War of Independence. He is celebrated as a hero of independence, and the state of Anzoátegui was named for him.

See also
 Anzoátegui

1789 births
1819 deaths
People from Barcelona, Venezuela
Venezuelan people of Basque descent
Colombian military personnel
People of the Venezuelan War of Independence
Venezuelan soldiers